Goose Creek may refer to the following places in the United States:

Water bodies
Goose Creek (Rio Grande), a tributary to the Rio Grande running by the Wagon Wheel Gap Hot Springs Resort near Creede, Colorado
 Tiber Creek, formerly known as Goose Creek, in the District of Columbia
 Goose Creek (Florida), the site of an American Civil War skirmish
 Goose Creek (Idaho), a tributary of Little Salmon River
 Goose Creek (Snake River) in Idaho, Utah, and Nevada
 Goose Creek (Iowa River), a river in Iowa
 Goose Creek (Louisville, Kentucky), a tributary of the Ohio River
 Goose Creek (Oneida, Kentucky), a tributary of the Kentucky River
 Goose Creek (River Raisin), in Michigan
 Goose Creek (Bear Creek), a stream in Missouri
 Goose Creek (Big Creek), a stream in Missouri
 Goose Creek (Cedar Creek), a stream in Missouri
 Goose Creek (Fourche a Du Clos), a stream in Missouri
 Goose Creek (Indian Creek), a stream in Missouri
 Goose Creek (Saline Creek), a stream in Missouri
 Goose Creek (Shoal Creek), a stream in Missouri
 Toms River, formerly known as Goose Creek, in New Jersey
 Goose Creek (North Carolina), a tidal tributary of the Pamlico River
 Goose Creek State Park in North Carolina
 Goose Creek (Rocky River tributary), a stream in Mecklenburg and Union Counties, North Carolina
 Goose Creek (Ohio), a stream in Preble County
 Goose Creek (Pennsylvania), a stream in Chester County
 Goose Creek (Potomac River), in northern Virginia, the site of an 1863 skirmish during the Gettysburg Campaign of the American Civil War
 Goose Creek (Wyoming), river in Sheridan County, Wyoming
 Goose Creek (Manitoba, Churchill)
 Goose Creek (Manitoba, Nelson), a tributary to the Nelson River in northern Manitoba, Canada

Communities
 Goose Creek, Kentucky, the incorporated city within Louisville Metro
 Goose Creek, Louisville, a neighborhood within Louisville proper
 Goose Creek, South Carolina, located just outside Charleston; also the location of a U.S. Navy Weapons Station
 Goose Creek, Texas, a former town in Texas that became part of modern Baytown

Other
 Goose Creek Symphony, an American rock band
 Goose Creek Oil Field, one of major oil fields that created the Texas Oil Boom
 Goose Creek Correctional Center, an Alaskan state prison

See also